Kirikou and the Sorceress is a 1998 traditional animation feature film written and directed by Michel Ocelot. Drawn from elements of West African folk tales, it depicts how a newborn boy, Kirikou, saves his village from the evil witch Karaba. The film was originally released on 9 December 1998. It is a co-production between companies in France (Exposure, France 3 Cinema, Les Armateurs, Monipoly, Odec Kid Cartoons), Belgium (Radio-Télévision belge) and Luxembourg (Studio O, Trans Europe Film) and animated at Rija Films' studio in Latvia and Studio Exist in Hungary.

It was so successful that it was followed by Kirikou et les bêtes sauvages, released in 2005, and adapted into a stage musical, Kirikou et Karaba, first performed in 2007. Another follow-up, Kirikou et les hommes et les femmes, was released in late 2012.

Plot
In a little West African village, a boy named Kirikou is born. He is not a normal baby, as he can speak before birth and walk immediately after birth. After Kirikou's mother tells him that an evil sorceress, Karaba, has dried up their spring and eaten all the men of the village except for one, he decides to accompany the last warrior, his uncle, to visit her and use intercourse as a means to stop her. Kirikou manages to trick the sorceress and save his uncle by waiting inside his uncle's hat and pretending that it's magic. Additionally, he saves the village's children from being kidnapped both by the sorceress's boat and tree, and kills the monster who was drinking all the village's water, gaining trust and stature in the eyes of the previously skeptical villagers. With the help of his mother and various animals, Kirikou then evades Karaba's watchmen and travels into a forbidden mountain to ask his wise old grandfather about the sorceress. His grandfather tells him that she is evil because she suffers from a poisoned thorn in her back, which causes her great pain and also gives her great power. After learning this, Kirikou manages to take the sorceress's stolen gold, thus luring her outside to where he can trick her and extract the poisoned thorn. As a result, the sorceress is cured of her suffering, and she kisses Kirikou, who then becomes an adult. When Kirikou and Karaba arrive back at the village, no one believes that the sorceress is cured until a procession of drummers arrive with Kirikou's grandfather. The drummers turn out to be the sorceress's watchmen and henchmen restored to their original human forms, the missing men of the village, whom she hadn't eaten after all.

Cast

French voice cast
 Doudou Gueye Thiaw: Child Kirikou
 Awa Sene Sarr: Karaba
 Maimouna N'Diaye: Kirikou's mother
 Robert Liensol: Kirikou's grandfather
 William Nadylam: Adult Kirikou
 Sébastien Hébrant: Adult Kirikou
 Rémi Bichet: Adult Kirikou
 Thilombo Lubambu: Kirikou's uncle
 Marie Augustine Diatta: the force woman
 Moustafa Diop: the fetish on the roof
 Isseu Niang: the small woman
 Selly Raby Kane: Zoé, the big girl
 Erick Patrick Correa: Boris, the big boy
 Adjoua Barry: Boulette, a girl
 Charles Edouard Gomis Correa: a boy
 Marie-Louise Shedeye Diiddi: the little girl
 Abdoulayé Diop Yama: the old person
 Josephine Theodora M'Boup: a woman
 Tabata N'Diaye: the old woman
 Samba Wane: fetish talked
 Aminatha N'Diaye: a mother
 François Chicaïa: man of the village
 N'Deyé Aïta N'Diaye: woman of the village
 Abdou El Aziz Gueye: man of the village
 Boury Kandé: woman of the village
 Assy Dieng Bâ: Karaba's scream
 Michel Elias: animal sounds

English voice cast
 Theodore Sibusiso Sibeko: Kirikou
 Antoinette Kellermann: Karaba
 Fezile Mpela: Uncle
 Kombisile Sangweni: The Mother
 Mabutho Kid Sithole: The Old Man

Swahili voice cast
 Samson Komeka: Kirikou

Japanese voice cast
 Ryūnosuke Kamiki: Kirikou
 Atsuko Asano: Karaba
 Kaori Yamagata: Mother

Production 
The film is a co-production of Les Armateurs, Trans Europe Film, Studio O, France 3 cinéma, RTBF and Exposure in France, Odec Kid Cartoons in Belgium and Monipoly in Luxembourg. It was animated at Rija Films' animation studio in Latvia and Studio Exist in Hungary, with backgrounds painted at Les Armateurs and Paul Thiltges' animation studio, Tiramisu, in Luxembourg, digital ink and paint and compositing by Les Armateurs and Odec Kid Cartoons in Belgium and voices and music recorded in Senegal.

The original French voice acting was performed by a cast of West African actors and schoolchildren and recorded in Dakar. The English dubbing, also directed by Ocelot, was made in South Africa. A dub of the film in the Swahili language was produced in Tanzania in 2009 through the help of the Danish Film Institute (DFI) and John Riber of Media for Development in Dar es Salaam.

Controversy
The film contains many instances of nudity that reflect the non-sexualized view of the human body in the West African culture depicted. This was controversial enough in the U.S. and the U.K. to prevent its release. Eventually, the British Film Institute gave the film a few screenings in the U.K., and in the U.S. specialist distributor Artmattan released it to a small but appreciative African-American audience.

Release
The film has been licensed by distributors in numerous countries, including:
 Argentina – Prodifilms
 Brazil – Cult Filmes (VHS), Paulinas Multimídia (DVD)
 Canada – Remstar Distribution
 Denmark – Angel Films A/S
 France – Gébéka Films
 Germany – MFA Filmdistribution 
 Italy – Mikado Film
 Japan – Albatros Film (2003, theatrical), Ghibli Cinema Library/Buena Vista Home Entertainment (DVD/VHS)
 Russia – RUSCICO (2004, video)
 Spain – Alta Classics S.L. Unipersonal
 United Kingdom – British Film Institute
 United States – ArtMattan Productions (2000, dubbed)

Soundtrack
The ending theme for the film is called "Kirikou by Boubacar Mendy", released on Virgin EMI.

Accolades

Notes

External links

 Kirikou and the Sorceress official USA Web site
 Kirikou and the Sorceress official USA Web site to purchase DVD
 Kirikou et la sorcière at Le Palais des dessins animés
 
 
 
 
 BBCi review
 The Guardian review

Annecy Cristal for a Feature Film winners
1998 animated films
1998 fantasy films
1998 films
Belgian animated fantasy films
1990s children's adventure films
1990s children's fantasy films
1990s French animated films
French fantasy adventure films
Films based on fairy tales
Films directed by Michel Ocelot
Films set in Africa
French animated fantasy films
Luxembourgian animated fantasy films
1998 directorial debut films
Films about witchcraft
Films set in pre-colonial sub-Saharan Africa
Animated coming-of-age films
1990s French-language films
1990s French films
French-language Belgian films